Woodhay railway station was a station on the Didcot, Newbury and Southampton Railway in England. It was located about five miles south of the junction with the Great Western Railway west of Newbury railway station. Woodhay station served the villages of Enborne and Enborne Row in Berkshire and Broad Laying (Woolton Hill) in the parish of East Woodhay, Hampshire. It was a considerable distance from the villages of East Woodhay and West Woodhay. The site now lies under the A34 Newbury by-pass.

Facilities
Like most country stations on the line it originally consisted of two platforms, the southbound platform on the passing loop. Since the station was built on a bank it was not possible to construct strong foundations for a brick-built station building. Hence this was the only station on the line with a wooden station building located on the southbound platform. Two sidings and a headshunt were built to the south of the station for goods. These were primarily used for horses and wood cut from nearby pine forests.

Accidents and incidents
In December 1957, a freight train overran signals and was derailed by trap points.

Closure
Both the station and the railway was closed in the 1960s.

Routes

Typical timetable
Page 45 of the 1910 Bradshaw's railway timetable gives the train times:
Woodhay - Newbury
08:22 - 08:29
08:53 - 09:00
11:52 - 11:59
13:12 - 13:19
15:45 - 15:53
17:45 - 17:53
18:53 - 19:00

Newbury - Woodhay
07:48 - 07:57
08:59 - 09:07
11:42 - 11:53
13:55 - 14:03
16:15 - 16:25
19:00 - 19:08
20:47 - 20:55

References

Disused railway stations in Hampshire
Former Great Western Railway stations
Railway stations in Great Britain opened in 1885
Railway stations in Great Britain closed in 1942
Railway stations in Great Britain opened in 1943
Railway stations in Great Britain closed in 1960